Campanelli is a surname. Notable people with the surname include:

 Alfred Campanelli (1925–2003), real-estate developer
 Lou Campanelli (1938-2023), American basketball coach
 Manuela Campanelli (born 1962), Italian science journalist
 Pauline Campanelli (1943–2001), artist
 Rick Campanelli (born 1970), Canadian television personality

Fictional characters:
 Tessa Campanelli, character in the television series Degrassi High

See also
 Campanelle, variety of pasta
 Glockenspiel, also called campanelli

Italian-language surnames